Kendra Reynolds (born January 25, 1993) is a New Zealand rugby union player. She plays Flanker for New Zealand and was a member of their champion 2021 Rugby World Cup squad. She also plays for Matatū in the Super Rugby Aupiki competition

Rugby career

2019–2021 
Reynolds played for the New Zealand Development XV at the 2019 Oceania Rugby Women's Championship in Fiji. She made her provincial debut for Waikato in 2012, before moving to Bay of Plenty in 2014 and playing for the Volcanix.

Reynolds made her test debut for the Black Ferns against France in 2021.

2022 
Reynolds was named in the Matatū squad for the inaugural Super Rugby Aupiki season for 2022. She was announced as vice-captain along with Kendra Cocksedge.

Reynolds was named in the Black Ferns squad for the 2022 Pacific Four Series. She scored her first international try against the United States in the Pacific series. She was reselected for the squad for the August test series against the Wallaroos for the Laurie O'Reilly Cup.

Reynolds was selected for the Black Ferns 2021 Rugby World Cup 32-player squad.

References

External links 
 Black Ferns Profile

1993 births
Living people
New Zealand women's international rugby union players
New Zealand female rugby union players